The Lynchburg Hospital is a historic hospital complex located on the corner of Federal Street and Hollins Mill Road in Lynchburg, Virginia.  It consists of the main hospital building, the nurse's home, an office building, a picnic pavilion, a storage building, and a boiler building. It was built in 1911 by the City of Lynchburg to serve as the city's municipal hospital. As designed, the original hospital was divided into two sections, a three-story main block and a rear annex, featuring Georgian Revival detailing. It is now a nursing home known as Tinbridge Manor.

It was listed on the National Register of Historic Places in 1999.

References

Hospital buildings completed in 1911
Hospital buildings on the National Register of Historic Places in Virginia
Neoclassical architecture in Virginia
Colonial Revival architecture in Virginia
Buildings and structures in Lynchburg, Virginia
National Register of Historic Places in Lynchburg, Virginia
1911 establishments in Virginia
Municipal hospitals